The R381 is a Regional Route in South Africa that connects the N1 at Beaufort West in the south with Loxton in the north.

From Beaufort West, in the Western Cape, the route passes through the Rosesberg Pass to reach the Karoo National Park. It then enters the Molteno Pass through the Nuweveld Mountains. Just before reaching Loxton, the route crosses into the Northern Cape. It receives the eastern terminus of the R356 before ending in Loxton at a junction with the R63. The road is mostly untarred, with some tarred segments.

References

External links
 Routes Travel Info

Regional Routes in the Western Cape
Regional Routes in the Northern Cape